San Francisco Foundation is a San Francisco Bay Area philanthropy organization. It is one of the largest community foundations in the United States. Its mission is to mobilize community leaders, nonprofits, government agencies, and donors to advance racial equity, diversity, and economic inclusion. It focuses on social justice, community building, access to affordable housing, political action, policy change, workers' rights, employment opportunity, and civic leadership. Its current CEO is Fred Blackwell Jr.

History
On January 14, 1948, the San Francisco Foundation officially launched with a luncheon at the Sir Francis Drake hotel just off of San Francisco's Union Square. Daniel E. Koshland Sr. served as the foundation's first chairman. The foundation was established to provide the community with “a contemporary agency sensitive to current social needs, and one which will help build a future which will magnify the opportunities of generations yet to be born,” according to the foundation's inaugural press release.

Grantmaking, programs, and funds
San Francisco Foundation manages and administers grants, programs, and funds that help to support its agenda of racial equity, diversity, and economic inclusion. These programs and funds include the Bay Area Leads Fund; Koshland Civic Unity Program; Multicultural Fellowship Program; Womxn of Color, Womxn of Power Program; Rapid Response Fund for Movement Building; FAITHS (Foundation Alliance with Interfaith to Heal Society); Artistic Hubs Cohort; and Bay Area Community Impact Fund.

As of the end of fiscal year 2021, the foundation's total assets under management were $1.9 billion, with a total of $178 million in contributions and bequests. Its total grants issued were $166 million.

Collaboratives
San Francisco Foundation works with various partners in several affiliated organizations that advance the foundation's agenda: ReWork the Bay, Great Communities Collaborative, HOPE SF, Keep Oakland Housed, Partnership for the Bay's Future, and Oakland Codes.

Awards and scholarships
San Francisco Foundation issues awards and scholarships to youth and artists to promote leadership, support disadvantaged community members, and foster artistic growth: the Koshland Young Leader Awards, SFF/Nomadic Press Literary Award, Murphy Award and the Cadogan Scholarships, and the Rella Lossy Award.

References

External links
San Francisco Foundation, official website

Community foundations based in the United States
Non-profit organizations based in San Francisco